Bradley Robinson (born January 24, 1985 in Duncan, South Carolina) is a former professional Canadian football defensive back who played for the Edmonton Eskimos of the Canadian Football League. He was signed as a street free agent by the Eskimos in 2008. He played college football for the Middle Tennessee Blue Raiders.

External links
Just Sports Stats

1985 births
Living people
Canadian football defensive backs
Edmonton Elks players
Middle Tennessee Blue Raiders football players
People from Duncan, South Carolina

American players of Canadian football